The Amiiformes  order of fish has only two extant species, the bowfins: Amia calva and Amia ocellicauda, the latter recognized as a separate species in 2022. These Amiiformes are found in the freshwater systems of North America, in the United States and parts of southern Canada. They live in freshwater streams, rivers, and swamps. 

Bowfins are not on the endangered list. They have the ability to go to the surface to breathe air if the water level is too low. Characteristics of Amiiformes are a cylindrical body with a long dorsal fin, single gular plate, heterocercal caudal fin, 10 to 13 flattened branchiostegal rays, maxilla included in gape, and prominent ocellus near upper base of caudal fin.

Evolution and diversity
The extinct species of the Amiiformes can be found as fossils in Asia and Europe, but the bowfin is the last living species in the order. Amiiformes is therefore the last surviving order of Halecomorphi, the clade to which the bowfin and its fossil relatives belong. Other orders, such as the Parasemionotiformes, are all extinct.

Halecomorphs, and its sister group Ginglymodi, belong to Holostei. Holosteans are the sister group of teleosteans, the group to which nearly all (i.e., 96%) living fishes belong to. Holosteans and Teleosts form a clade called Neopterygii. The following cladogram summarizes the evolutionary relationships of living and fossil Halecomorphs, and other neopterygians.

Amiiformes likely originated in the western Tethys Ocean, in what is now Europe. The oldest member of the Amiiformes is Caturus heterurus from the lower Lias (Sinemurian) of England. Amiiformes had spread to North America and Africa by the end of the Middle Jurassic, reaching an apex of diversity during the Early Cretaceous, during the Late Cretaceous and Cenozoic, the group declined until only a single species, the bowfin remained.

Taxonomy
 Order Amiiformes Hay, 1929
 Genus †Guizhouamia Liu, Yin & Wang, 2002
 Genus †Otomitla Felix, 1891
 Genus †Paraliodesmus Dunkle, 1969
 Superfamily †Caturoidea
 Genus †Eurypoma Huxley, 1866
 Genus †Gymnoichthys? Tintori et al., 2010
 Genus †Liodesmus Wagner, 1859
 Genus †Strobilodus Wagner, 1851
 Family †Caturidae Owen, 1860
 Genus †Catutoichthys Gouiric-Cavalli, 2016
 Genus †Amblysemius Agassiz, 1844
 Genus †Caturus Agassiz, 1834
 Superfamily Amioidea Bonaparte, 1838
 Genus †Amiidarum? Lange, 1968 [Otolith]
 Genus †Ferganamia? Kaznyshkin, 1990
 Genus †Lehmanamia? Casier, 1966
 Genus †Tomognathus Dixon, 1850
Family Sinamiidae Berg, 1940
Genus †Ikechaoamia Liu, 1961
Genus †Siamamia Cavin et al., 2007
Genus †Sinamia Stensiö, 1935
 Family Amiidae Bonaparte, 1837
 Subfamily Amiinae Bonaparte, 1837 (sensu Grande & Bemis, 1998)
 Genus Amia Linnaeus, 1766
 Genus †Cyclurus Agassiz, 1839
 Genus †Pseudamiatus Whitley, 1954
 Subfamily †Amiopsinae Grande & Bemis, 1998
 Genus †Amiopsis Kner, 1863
 Subfamily †Solnhofenamiinae Grande & Bemis, 1998
 Genus †Solnhofenamia Grande & Bemis, 1998
 Subfamily †Vidalamiinae Grande & Bemis, 1998
 Tribe †Calamopleurini Grande & Bemis, 1998
 Genus †Calamopleurus Agassiz, 1841
 Genus †Maliamia Patterson & Longbottom, 1989
 Tribe †Vidalamiini Grande & Bemis, 1998
 Genus †Melvius Bryant, 1987
 Genus †Pachyamia Chalifa & Tchernov 1982
 Genus †Vidalamia White & Moy-Thomas, 1941
 Genus †Nipponamia Yabumoto, 1994

References

External links

 
Articles which contain graphical timelines
Ray-finned fish orders